China's Solar Valley   located in Dezhou, Shandong province, China, is pilot project of the so-called future city template that feature the full application of solar and clean energy technologies.

Green city template 
The Solar Valley has been described as "a massive exercise in social, economic and ecological engineering" using solar power in China. It is planned to cost $740 million USD, which includes $10 million to install solar lighting along  roadways. The concept pursues the goal of low carbon mitigation through the application of solar-based low-carbon and microemission technologies in transportation, building capacities, and entertainment areas. Solar Valley occupies more than 330 hectares of land, which is intended to host a 60,000 square-meter solar floor area that can produce enough energy to power not just the valley but also the entire mid-size city like Dezhou.

The project, which began in 2004, is led by Himin Solar Energy Group, the world's largest solar water heater manufacturer. It is being undertaken in line with China's renewable energy policy in partnership with the Dezhou local government.

Etymology
Solar Valley is named after Silicon Valley.

See also
Renewable energy commercialization
Solar energy in China
Renewable energy in China (Wind, Solar, and Geothermal)
Economic and Technological Development Zones
Suzhou Industrial Park
Dalian Software Park
Zhangjiang Hi-Tech Park

References

Industrial parks in China
Energy in China
Environmental technology
Buildings and structures in Shandong